Udea radiosalis is a moth in the family Crambidae. It was described by Heinrich Benno Möschler in 1883. It is found in North America, where it has been recorded from Alberta, Arizona, California, Montana, Nevada, Newfoundland and Labrador and Utah.

The wingspan is about 21 mm. Adults have been recorded on wing from July to September.

References

radiosalis
Moths described in 1883